The slender unicorn rattail, Trachyrincus longirostris, is a rattail of the genus Trachyrincus, found in south-east Australia and New Zealand, at depths of between 850 and 1,300 m.  Its length is between 30 and 60 cm.

References

 
 Tony Ayling & Geoffrey Cox, Collins Guide to the Sea Fishes of New Zealand,  (William Collins Publishers Ltd, Auckland, New Zealand 1982) 

Macrouridae
Fish described in 1878
Taxa named by Albert Günther